João Paulo Pereira Gomes (born 8 May 1989), known as João Paulo, is a Portuguese footballer who plays for Torreense as a defender.

Career
On 29 June 2022, João Paulo signed with Liga Portugal 2 club Torreense.

References

External links

1989 births
Sportspeople from Braga
Living people
Portuguese footballers
Association football defenders
Merelinense F.C. players
Vilaverdense F.C. players
C.D. Aves players
CFR Cluj players
Portimonense S.C. players
F.C. Penafiel players
C.D. Trofense players
S.C.U. Torreense players
Liga Portugal 2 players
Campeonato de Portugal (league) players
Portuguese expatriate footballers
Expatriate footballers in Romania
Portuguese expatriate sportspeople in Romania